Jamestown Revival is an American folk duo made up of Zach Chance and Jonathan Clay. The childhood friends from Magnolia, Texas, write songs about everyday life that are a combination of harmonies that merge Southern country, Americana and Western rock music. Their first album Utah was originally self-released in early 2014 and then re-released by Republic Records later the same year. iTunes named Utah Best of 2014: Singer-Songwriter Album of the Year. 
Jamestown Revival has been featured in Rolling Stone magazine and covered in the Wall Street Journal. The band has made appearances at music festivals in the U.S., including the South by Southwest (SXSW) music festival in Austin, Texas, Coachella Valley Music and Arts Festival, Bonnaroo Music & Arts Festival, Austin City Limits Music Festival, and a musical appearance on Conan.

History
Zach Chance and Jonathan Clay grew up together in Magnolia, Texas, and collaborated on their first song at the age of 15. Each launched solo singer-songwriter careers and were on tour as individual artists who would sing harmonies on each other's work. It was decided to form a band with harmonies at the forefront as it generated positive audience response. Jamestown Revival was formed in 2010 as a duo and expanded to a five-member band. The name Jamestown Revival was derived from one of the first United States settlements, Jamestown, Virginia, homage to Creedence Clearwater Revival, and the concept of leaving behind the old and starting anew. The band wrote music they wanted to hear rather than what appealed to the masses using the music they listened to as a gauge of quality of their work. The band's music inspirations come from storytellers of adventure such as Louis L'Amour, Willie Nelson and John Prine as well as nature, and simplicity. Jamestown Revival's first album, Utah, was named for the band's recording location in the Wasatch mountains, Utah, where while living in a cabin they used minimal recording studio equipment to create a unique style. The band's move from Texas to California inspired their song "California (Cast Iron Soul)".

Members

Current
 Zach Chance – piano, vocals
 Jonathan Clay – guitar, vocals
 Ed Benrock – drums
 Nick Bearden – bass
 Dan Reckard - organ, keys 
Preston Wimberly - guitar

Previous
 Brad Lindsay – guitar

Discography

Albums

Studio albums

Live albums

Extended plays

Singles

Music videos

Footnotes

References

Rock music groups from Texas
Musical groups established in 2011
Rock music duos
American musical duos
2011 establishments in Texas